Abdumalik Abdullayevich Abdullajanov (born January 1, 1949) is a Tajikistani politician, born in Leninabad. He served as the third Prime Minister of Tajikistan from September 21, 1992, to December 18, 1993. He resigned as Prime Minister to become Tajikistan's first ambassador to Russia. In 1994, he ran in the second presidential elections in Tajikistan but, according to official reports, lost to Emomali Rahmon, Tajikistan's current president. After that, he left Tajikistan, stayed in Russia for several years, then moved to the United States in 1998 and lived there since then; Abdullajanov had refugee status there. Abdullajanov was detained at Boryspil International Airport (near Ukrainian capital Kyiv) on the request of the Tajik authorities upon arriving from Los Angeles on 5 February 2013. Tajik authorities accuse Abdullajanov of plotting an assassination attempt on Rahmon on 30 April 1997, when the president was wounded in the leg. Abdullajanov was also charged with organizing a riot in the Sughd Province which claimed dozens of lives in 1998. Abdullajanov has denied any involvement in his interviews to Western media. On 4 April 2013 Ukraine  freed Abdullajanov from detention and refused a request to extradite him to his homeland.

Rumors have circulated that "Abdullajanov would support an opposition candidate who has not yet declared his participation" in the November 2013 Tajikistani presidential election, but because Abdullajanov has not been interviewed for a long time his stand on the issue is unclear.

References

1949 births
Living people
People from Khujand
Prime Ministers of Tajikistan
Ambassadors of Tajikistan to Russia
Tajikistani exiles
Heads of government who were later imprisoned